Carlo Ignazio Giulio (11 August 1803 – 29 June 1859) was an Italian mathematician, mechanical engineer and politician.

Bibliography

References

1803 births
1859 deaths
Italian mathematicians
Engineers from Turin
Italian politicians